Natalia Kanem is a medical doctor who currently serves as the Executive Director of UNFPA, the United Nations sexual and reproductive health agency. In this capacity, she is among the highest-ranking women at the United Nations and the first Latin American to head UNFPA.

Early life and education 
Kanem attended Harvard University, where she graduated magna cum laude with bachelor's degrees in history and science. She became involved in issues relating to women's rights as a Harvard undergraduate when she attended the first UN World Conference on Women in 1975. She went on to earn a medical degree from Columbia University in New York, and a Master in Public Health with specializations in Epidemiology and Preventative Medicine from the University of Washington, Seattle.

Career

Early career 
Kanem started her career in academia at the Johns Hopkins University and Columbia University schools of medicine and public health. She was Senior Associate at the Lloyd Best Institute of the West Indies in Trinidad and Tobago from 2012 to 2013. From 2005 to 2011, she was the founding president of ELMA Philanthropies, a private institution focusing primarily on children and youth in Africa.

Ford Foundation 
Kanem worked as a Ford Foundation officer from 1992 to 2005, where she pioneered work in women's reproductive health and sexuality, in particular through her position as the foundation's representative for West Africa. She then served as Deputy Vice-President for the Ford Foundation' s worldwide peace and social justice programmes in Africa, Asia, Eastern Europe, South America, and North America.

United Nations Population Fund 
Before becoming UNFPA Executive Director, Kanem served as the agency's representative in Tanzania from 2014 to 2016. She then went on to become Deputy Executive Director in charge of Programmes at UNFPA Headquarters, in New York from 2014 to 2016. On 3 October 2017, Kanem was appointed as Executive Director of UNFPA by United Nations Secretary-General Antonio Guterres. Under her leadership, UNFPA has focused on achieving three results: zero maternal deaths, zero unmet need for family planning, and zero gender-based violence and harmful practices.

Other activities 
 Joint United Nations Programme on HIV/AIDS (UNAIDS), Ex-Officio Member of the Committee of Cosponsoring Organizations (since 2017)
 Partnership for Maternal, Newborn & Child Health (PMNCH), Member of the Board
 United Nations System Staff College (UNSSC), Member of the Board of Governors 
 Dag Hammarskjöld Fund for Journalists, Member of the Honorary Advisory Council
 Family Planning 2020 (FP2020), Co-Chair of the Reference Group (alongside Christopher Elias, since 2017)
 TrustAfrica, former Member of the Board
 Member, Inter-American Dialogue

References 

Living people
Harvard University alumni
University of Washington School of Public Health alumni
Columbia University Vagelos College of Physicians and Surgeons alumni
Year of birth missing (living people)
United Nations Population Fund
Johns Hopkins University faculty
Members of the Inter-American Dialogue